Supreme Petrochem Ltd (SPL) is India’s largest producer and exporter of polystyrene polymer based in Mumbai, Maharashtra, India. In Indian market it has share of more than 50%. SPL is also the largest exporter of PS from India, exporting to over 93 countries around the globe.

References

External links
Supreme Petrochem

Chemical companies based in Mumbai
Chemical companies established in 1995
Non-renewable resource companies established in 1995
Petrochemical companies of India
1995 establishments in Maharashtra
Companies listed on the National Stock Exchange of India
Companies listed on the Bombay Stock Exchange